Independence is an unincorporated community in Washington County, Texas, United States.  Located twelve miles northeast of Brenham, it was founded in 1835 in Austin's colony of Anglo-Americans.  It became a Baptist religious and educational center of the Republic of Texas.  In 1845 it became the first site of Baylor University and the University of Mary Hardin-Baylor.

The wealthiest community in Texas in 1845, Independence declined later in the century after refusing to give a right-of-way to the Santa Fe Railroad.  It was bypassed by the increasingly important railroads and started a long decline after the university moved away.  It retains significant historic structures and sites of the nineteenth century.  Its residents included many prominent people of early Texas history, including Sam Houston while he was a U.S. Senator. The Houston family were well-known members of the Independence Baptist Church.

History
Independence was once a significant center for religion and education in the Republic of Texas.

The year of the town's founding (1835), Frances J. S. Trask of Gloucester, Massachusetts, started a boarding school for girls.  In 1839 the Independence Baptist Church was organized, the fourth Missionary Baptist Church in Texas.  It continues as an active congregation, the second-oldest one affiliated with the Baptist General Convention of Texas.

In 1845, Independence won the bid for a Texas university. The regional Union Baptist Association, which had originated the university proposal, built the institution, chartered by the Republic of Texas Congress. It was named after one of its founders, R.E.B. Baylor, a former U.S. Congressman. Baylor University opened its doors in 1846, the first year of Texas statehood, with a total of 24 students, both male and female. (Later the women were separated into an independent institution, known as Baylor Women's College.)  In 1852 the town was incorporated, with T.T. Clay as its first mayor. Soon it had a hotel, a Masonic Lodge, stagecoach depot, and a small commercial center.  The residents built fine homes, several of which have been preserved.

In 1854, Sam Houston was baptized by Rev. Rufus Columbus Burleson, president of Baylor University. at Independence. His wife Margaret Lea Houston and her mother Nancy Moffette Lea died in the town during the 1860s and were buried at the family's cemetery there. (Sam Houston's grave is in Huntsville, Texas.)

When the Santa Fe Railroad wanted to establish a line through town, the city leaders refused to grant it a right-of-way. By the 1880s, most railroads bypassed the town, taking trade with them.  As students found it difficult to get transportation to Independence, Baylor University officials decided in 1885 to move the institution to a more accessible location, Waco. The women's college was moved to Belton, where it became known as the University of Mary Hardin-Baylor.  These changes added to the long decline of Independence. By 1966 it had 200 residents, and by 1990 it had 140, qualifying as a rural settlement. The population was unchanged in 2000.

The community has retained several significant historic structures and sites from its nineteenth-century peak. Its attractions include the Texas Baptist Historical Center; the home of Judge J.P. Coles, one of the Old Three Hundred of the Austin Colony; Baylor College Park; Old Independence Cemetery, a state historic site; and Houston-Lea Family Cemetery.  The Margaret Houston House is on the National Register of Historic Places, as are the Seward Plantation and the Asa Hoxey House.

Notable 19th-century residents
Sam Houston
Margaret Lea Houston
George Washington Baines
Jerome B. Robertson
William Bizzell

References

Further reading
 B. D. Augustin, "Independence: The Athens of Early Texas," Texas Highways, March 1984. 
 T. Lindsay Baker, Ghost Towns of Texas, Norman, OK: University of Oklahoma Press, 1986. 
 Lois Smith Murray, Baylor at Independence, Waco, TX: Baylor University Press, 1972. 
 Gracey Booker Toland, Austin Knew His Athens, San Antonio, TX: Naylor, 1958.

Unincorporated communities in Washington County, Texas
Unincorporated communities in Texas
Populated places established in 1835